The 2008 FIA Formula One World Championship was the 62nd season of Formula One motor racing, recognised by the Fédération Internationale de l'Automobile (FIA) – the governing body of motorsport – as the highest class of competition for open-wheel racing cars. The championship was contested over eighteen races commencing in Australia on 16 March and ending in Brazil on 2 November. The 2008 season saw the debut of the Singapore Grand Prix, which was held at the Marina Bay Street Circuit, in Marina Bay, Singapore and was the first Formula One race held at night. The European Grand Prix moved to a new venue at the Valencia Street Circuit, in Valencia, Spain.

Lewis Hamilton won the Drivers' title by a point – by overtaking Toyota's Timo Glock on the final corner of the final lap of the final Grand Prix of the season to claim the required 5th-place finish to win the championship – from Brazilian Felipe Massa, while Massa's teammate, the 2007 World Champion Kimi Räikkönen, was ranked third, with two wins. Scuderia Ferrari Marlboro won the Constructors' title. In winning the Drivers' title, Hamilton became the youngest driver ever to win the title (a record since surpassed by Sebastian Vettel winning the  Drivers' title) and the first black driver to do so.

Eleven teams competed in the championship, although Super Aguri withdrew on 6 May from the 2008 Formula One season due to financial troubles, completing four races. Fernando Alonso won the first race held in Singapore; however, only after teammate Piquet deliberately crashed to cause a Safety Car period which helped Alonso's strategy. When Piquet admitted this to the press in  Renault team-principal Briatore resigned. Some journalists dubbed this "Crashgate".

This was the last season for the Honda team before they pulled out of F1 later in December due to the financial difficulties. Honda returned as an engine supplier between 2015 and 2021. Ross Brawn then bought the team, and renamed it to Brawn GP in February  using the Mercedes-Benz engines.

It was the first time in the history of Formula One that all teams used the same two drivers throughout the season. As of 2022, this season marks the last World Drivers' Championship for McLaren, though Hamilton himself has since won six further drivers' titles at Mercedes. The 2008 season also marks Scuderia Ferrari's last World Constructors' Championship win as of the end of the 2022 championship.

Teams and drivers
There was a total of seven teams signed up to compete in the championship through an agreement with Formula One Management, with the other four major manufacturers in the Grand Prix Manufacturers' Association (GPMA) having signed a Memorandum of Understanding at the 2006 Spanish Grand Prix. All teams in both groups have two spots each on the 2008 grid. The following teams and drivers competed in the 2008 FIA Formula One World Championship: Teams competed with tyres supplied by Bridgestone.

 † All engines were 2.4-litre V8 configuration.

New entries
On 14 February 2006 the FIA president Max Mosley announced that all teams interested in competing in the 2008 World Championship would have a seven-day window during which they would have to submit an application to compete. All eleven current teams applied, as well as several others. On 28 April 2006 the FIA announced that all of the current teams' applications for the 2008 season were granted, along with a new team Prodrive, fronted by the ex-BAR and -Benetton principal David Richards. There were 21 applications in total, several new teams applying included European Minardi F1 Team Ltd, Jordan Grand Prix, Direxiv and Carlin Motorsport. However, despite the Prodrive application being accepted, Richards later announced that the team would not race in 2008 due to a dispute over the legality of customer cars.

Team changes
 Rumours about the possible sale of the Spyker team had been abundant in the paddock throughout the last few months of the 2007 season. Only a year after Spyker bought the team from Midland, Indian businessman Vijay Mallya bought the team for €88 million, several million more than Spyker paid. On 24 October 2007, Mallya was granted permission to change the team's name to Force India. Force India had a driver announcement ceremony in January 2008 where it was revealed that Sutil would be second driver partnered by first driver Giancarlo Fisichella and test driver Vitantonio Liuzzi.
 On 28 April 2006, rallying and motorsports technology firm Prodrive were officially granted entry to Formula One when the FIA announced the list of entrants to the 2008 Formula One World Championship. While a total of 21 teams applied for entry, the FIA had always maintained that only 12 teams would be granted entry, meaning only one new team would line up on the grid in 2008. FIA president Max Mosley revealed that Prodrive had found the finances to support their bid. Also, Prodrive's chief executive, David Richards, had experience as a Formula One team principal. However, on 23 November 2007, after lengthy negotiations between FIA president Max Mosley regarding customer cars, Richards announced that Prodrive F1 would not compete in the 2008 Formula One World Championship, as the legal situation left no time for the team to be set up.
 During the 2008 season on 6 May, the Super Aguri team folded and withdrew from Formula One. Super Aguri rejected a buyout offer in January 2008 from an Indian consortium led by the CEO of the Spice Group, on the condition Indian driver Narain Karthikeyan drove in the line-up, because it meant demoting or cutting one of the team's 2007 drivers. Despite this Super Aguri were unable to sign any contracts until agreements had been reached with their sponsors. Sato and Davidson were confirmed on 10 March. Super Aguri announced that a major deal had been made with Magma Group to solve the team's financial problems, however this fell through, and on 6 May 2008, Super Aguri withdrew from the Formula One World Championship. It affirmed a prediction at the start of the season by Max Mosley saying the team would not make it to the final race in Brazil.

Driver changes

2005 and 2006 World Champion Fernando Alonso left McLaren after a single season to rejoin Renault. He was replaced at McLaren by Heikki Kovalainen, who had replaced Alonso at Renault the previous season. Giancarlo Fisichella, Renault's other driver from 2007, moved to the newly renamed Force India team, in place of erstwhile Spyker driver Sakon Yamamoto, who became Renault's test development driver. Fisichella's place at Renault was taken by the team's test driver Nelson Piquet Jr. (son of the three-time World Drivers' Champion Nelson Piquet).

After an unsuccessful test for Force India in December 2007, Ralf Schumacher left Toyota to drive for Mücke Motorsport in the DTM series. 2007 GP2 champion Timo Glock, who had also been the test driver for BMW Sauber, returned to a Formula One race seat in place of Schumacher. Christian Klien, previously the test driver for Honda, and the Estonian driver Marko Asmer took up test driver roles at BMW Sauber.

Sébastien Bourdais, who won his fourth consecutive Champ Car title in 2007, joined Toro Rosso in 2008, replacing Vitantonio Liuzzi, who moved to Force India as their test driver.

Season calendar
The FIA World Council approved the 2008 schedule on 24 October 2007. Singapore was Formula One's first ever night race.

Calendar changes

 Singapore hosted its first Grand Prix in 2008, with a contract for the next five years. The race, held on a street circuit designed by KBR, is Formula One's first night race. The practice and qualifying sessions also take place at night.
 The European Grand Prix took place at the Valencia Street Circuit in 2008, changing from the Nürburgring which hosted the event up until 2007. Because both German circuits share the right to host an F1 race, the German Grand Prix took place at Hockenheimring in 2008. It continued to alternate between these two circuits yearly until 2014.
 The Indianapolis Motor Speedway did not hold a Grand Prix in 2008; however, a possible return to Indianapolis in the future was not completely ruled out, although the United States Grand Prix made its return in 2012 at the Circuit of the Americas in Austin, Texas.
 In the run up to the 2007 French Grand Prix it was reported that it would be the last Grand Prix to be held at Magny-Cours. Some alternatives suggested for the French Grand Prix included Paul Ricard or a new circuit near Disneyland Paris or Charles de Gaulle Airport. However, on 24 July 2007 it was reported that Bernie Ecclestone had "agreed in principle to maintain the race at Magny-Cours in 2008, and even 2009, if there were no other alternatives".

Regulation changes
 A standard Electronic Control Unit was supplied by Microsoft MES, a joint venture between Microsoft and McLaren Electronic Systems.
 Traction control banned along with engine braking reduction.
 An engine freeze to last five years was started in 2008, with the first unscheduled engine change of the season not leading to the usual 10 place grid penalty.
 Fuel of the cars must have been made up of at least 5.75% biological materials.
 Gearboxes to last four races, 5 place grid penalty for a gear box change. If a driver did not finish a race, he was allowed to change the gearbox for the next race without receiving a penalty.
 Improved cockpit protection.
 The use of a spare car was restricted. Each competing team would not be allowed to have more than two cars available for use at any time. In this context, a car was considered as such if it was a partially assembled survival cell, fitted with an engine, any front suspension, bodywork, radiators, oil tanks or heat exchangers.
 Bridgestone would be the official tyre supplier for the 2008–2010 seasons. They would also be marking their extreme wet weather tyres with a white line in the central groove to differentiate it from the softer wet weather tyre compound.
 No competing team was allowed to carry out more than 30,000 km (18,641 mi) of testing during the 2008 calendar year.

Qualifying
 The first part of qualifying lengthened to 20 minutes, and final part of qualifying shortened to 10 minutes. Teams taking part in Q3 would no longer be allowed to add fuel back to the car after qualifying to eliminate 'fuel-burn' phase.
 A minimum lap time for each qualifying session was implemented from Round 3 in Bahrain to stop cars coasting back to the pits at dangerously low speeds as seen in Round 2 in Malaysia. Both Lewis Hamilton and Heikki Kovalainen were demoted five grid places after the stewards decided that they had impeded Nick Heidfeld and Fernando Alonso. The minimum lap time was different for each race. For example, it was 1:39 in Bahrain.
 From 8 May 2008, the FIA announced that, following Super Aguri's departure from Formula One, the qualifying procedures changed. Rather than six drivers being eliminated at the end of Q1, only the five lowest-qualified drivers would be eliminated. This increased the likelihood that one of the midfield contenders would drop out, as only the top 15 drivers would go through to Q2. At the end of Q2 five rather than six cars would be eliminated as well.

Pre-season testing

The first multi-team test session started in Jerez on 14 January 2008. Ferrari, McLaren and Toyota all tested their 2008 cars. Williams tested a modified version of the FW29 whilst Renault and Red Bull tested their 2007 entries. Honda, Toro Rosso, Super Aguri and Force India also attended. BMW Sauber was not in attendance as they were launching the F1.08. Testing then moved to Valencia on 22 January. Renault and Williams were the only teams on the track for the first day of testing. They were both testing their 2008 challengers. They were joined by every other team except Super Aguri for the next three days. 1 February saw testing move to Barcelona. Again, all teams but Super Aguri were in action. The first day of testing saw Kazuki Nakajima crash his FW30. It also saw racist abuse directed at Lewis Hamilton. Williams withdrew from testing on day three to try to fix the problem that caused Nakajima's crash. Meanwhile, on 4 February, Ferrari and Toyota moved to Bahrain to continue testing the F2008 and TF108.

On 12 February testing returned to Jerez. Red Bull and Williams were the only teams in action on the first day. The second day of testing saw all teams but Ferrari and Toyota (who were still in Bahrain) attending. After postponing their SA08 launch and cancelling testing at Valencia, Super Aguri turned up to test their SA07B interim car for the first time.

Testing moved to Barcelona on 19 February. The first day of tests got underway in rain with Williams, Red Bull, Renault and Toyota present. Nico Rosberg topped the time sheets for Williams. BMW were instead testing on their own in Jerez. Super Aguri did not turn up despite promising a Q&A with the media. They blamed circumstances beyond their control. On the second day Ferrari turned up and topped the time sheets with Felipe Massa on another wet track. McLaren joined on the final day and Williams finished on top with Nakajima. The final multi-team test began on 25 February with every team but Super Aguri attending. Lewis Hamilton topped the time sheets faster than both Kimi Räikkönen and Michael Schumacher. McLaren continued to outpace Ferrari on day two with both drivers on top and Toyota were fastest with Jarno Trulli on the final day.

Report
Hamilton took pole and his fifth career victory at the first race in Australia. BMW Sauber's Nick Heidfeld finished second while Williams's Nico Rosberg sealed his first podium finish. The race saw only seven drivers finish the race, reduced to six after Honda's Rubens Barrichello was disqualified for exiting the pits under a red light. Despite an engine problem, Toro Rosso debutant Sébastien Bourdais completed over 90% of the race distance, earning him points in seventh.

A grid penalty for impeding drivers and a pit stop mishap left Hamilton in fifth place at Malaysia, while Räikkönen took his 16th career victory after he qualified in second position. BMW Sauber's Robert Kubica finished second for the first time with McLaren's Heikki Kovalainen third.

Hamilton qualified third at Bahrain despite a crash, with Kubica taking his first pole position. Massa won the race with teammate Räikkönen in second. Kubica made it onto the podium, while Hamilton had a bad race, finishing 13th. He was back in the points at Barcelona, while Räikkönen took Ferrari's third consecutive victory, Massa making it another 1–2.

Massa took pole and won for the third successive Istanbul race, Hamilton splitting the Ferraris on the podium. At Monaco, Ferrari locked out the front row with Massa on pole, but on a bad day for Ferrari, with Räikkönen ruining what could have been Sutil's chance to score, Hamilton won the race despite a mid-race barrier scrape causing him a puncture. Kubica finished second and Massa was third.

Hamilton was on pole position at Montreal for the first time since the beginning of the season, a drought of five races, however a pit lane mishap involving himself and Räikkönen eliminated both drivers from the race. Kubica (who also got caught up in the mess but made it through safely) won for the first time with teammate Heidfeld second.
Räikkönen started the French Grand Prix on pole, but exhaust problems allowed teammate Massa to get the better of him, and he took his third season victory. Hamilton won back-to-back at Silverstone and Hockenheim. Kovalainen took advantage of Massa's engine failure to take his first career victory at Hungary.

The new Valencia Street Circuit was the new host of the European Grand Prix, Massa taking pole and winning with Hamilton second. At Belgium, Hamilton qualified on pole and finished in first, though he received a 25-second penalty for gaining an advantage during a scrap with Räikkönen. Massa was the classified winner.

Toro Rosso driver Sebastian Vettel became the youngest ever pole man and victor after a stunning weekend at Monza. The race saw a downfall for the big teams, Kovalainen doing a good job for second.

Singapore hosted its first ever F1 race and F1's first ever night race, taking place at the Marina Bay Street Circuit. Massa qualified on pole, however, the race was to be a major blow to his championship. On lap 12, while Massa was leading, Renault driver Nelson Piquet Jr. purposely crashed (see 'Race-fixing controversy' below), although Piquet never released this until dropped from the team after the 2009 Hungarian Grand Prix, assisting teammate Fernando Alonso, who went on to win. He was victorious from a fuel feed problem in Q2 leaving him 15th on the grid, though he still out-qualified Piquet Jr. Rosberg finished on the podium for the second and last time in 2008. Massa was leading ahead of Hamilton, however, when he pitted under the safety car his fuel hose remained attached meaning that the pit crew had to run down the pit lane to detach it. This ruined Massa's race putting him in last position while Hamilton gained 6 points for 3rd place.

Alonso won again in Japan with Kubica second. Hamilton started the race on pole, however he was given a drive through penalty for running wide at the start and shortly afterwards was knocked into a spin by Felipe Massa. He was back to winning ways for the first time since Hockenheim, though, victorious at Shanghai.

At this point, Hamilton had a seven-point lead over Massa, meaning if Massa was to be the victor at his home race in Brazil, Hamilton would need to finish fifth, and he was holding this position though being stalked by Vettel, who eventually passed him on lap 69, as Massa won to momentarily take the title. Hamilton eventually regained fifth place, however, by passing Glock, who was struggling on dry tyres, and finished fifth to take the title by one point from Massa.

Race-fixing controversy

In a scandal that became known as "Crashgate" in the media, during the 2009 season around the time of the Belgium Grand Prix, allegations by former Renault driver Nelson Piquet Jr. about his crash in the 2008 Singapore Grand Prix led to charges of race-fixing against Renault and the departure of team boss Flavio Briatore and engineering director Pat Symonds.

Results and standings

Grands Prix

Scoring system

Points are awarded to drivers and constructors as follows:

World Drivers' Championship standings

Notes:
 – Drivers did not finish the Grand Prix, but were classified as they completed more than 90% of the race distance.

World Constructors' Championship standings

Notes:
 – Drivers did not finish the Grand Prix, but were classified as they completed more than 90% of the race distance.

Notes

References

External links

 2008 F1 Sporting Regulations, argent.fia.com, as archived at web.archive.org
 2008 FIA Formula One World Championship Classification, www.fia.com, as archived at web.archive.org
 formula1.com – 2008 official driver standings
 formula1.com – 2008 official team standings
 2008 Formula One images Retrieved from www.motorsport.com on 13 November 2008
 2008 Formula One videos Season review videos retrieved from several video sites
 2008 Formula One Circuits 2008 Formula One Race Tracks on Google Maps

Formula One seasons
 
Formula 1